Alan S. Rabson (July 1, 1926 – July 4, 2018) was an American pathologist and cancer researcher, and was deputy director of the National Cancer Institute from 1995 to 2015.

Early life and education
Born Alan Saul Rabinowitz in Brooklyn, New York on July 1, 1926, Rabson grew up in Jamaica, Queens, New York. He attended the University of Rochester as an undergraduate, and received his MD from the State University of New York.

Career 
He joined the Public Health Service during the Korean War and studied virology at what it now the Centers for Disease Control and Prevention. He joined the National Institutes of Health in 1955 as the only pathology resident at the newly opened NIH Clinical Center. After being hired as a faculty member a year later, he began his career of studying oncoviruses. He was the director of NCI's division of cancer biology from 1975 to 1995. He then served as deputy director of the NCI from 1995 until he retired in 2015. Rabson also had appointments as an instructor at George Washington University and Georgetown University.  He was an elected member of the National Academy of Medicine (Institute of Medicine).

Personal life 
Rabson was married to Ruth Kirschstein, a fellow pathologist at the NIH. They had one son, Arnold B. Rabson, who is also a physician. Rabson died in Skillman, New Jersey, on July 4, 2018, of vascular disease.

Alan S. Rabson Award 
In 2012, the NIH introduced the Alan S. Rabson Award for Clinical Care, which is given annually to NIH employees that show dedication to patient care.

References 

1926 births
2018 deaths
20th-century American physicians
21st-century American physicians
National Institutes of Health people
Cancer researchers
Physicians from New York City
University of Rochester alumni
Jewish American scientists
People from Brooklyn
SUNY Downstate College of Medicine alumni
Georgetown University faculty
George Washington University faculty
Members of the National Academy of Medicine